The Atatürk Centennial was celebrated in Turkey and the Turkish Government organized and supported a series of events, symposiums or conferences in several countries. The centennial of his birth was also honored by the UNESCO in November 1978 by adopting a Resolution on the Atatürk Centennial in which it decided to cooperate with the Turkish Government in the organization of events in memory of the Centennial. The centennial was celebrated officially between the 19 May 1981 and the 19 May 1982, but the congresses and conferences which were organized in Atatürks memory stretched through a larger time span. A considerable amount of scholars published books about Atatürks achievements.

Congresses and conventions organized in his memory 

 November 1980, The Atatürk International Conference organized by the Boğaziçi University with Afet İnan and Turhan Feyzioğlu as speakers among others 
 April 1981, The Ankara University Faculty of Education
 April 1981, The Atatürk Symposium at the Turkish Naval Academy in Istanbul 
 May 1981, The Atatürk Conference organized by the Ministry of Energy and Turkish Petroleum
 May 1981, The Second International Atatürk Conference at the Istanbul University with speakers Frank Tachau, François Georgeon, Sadi Irmak and Kemal Karpat among others
 May 1981, International Symposium on Atatürk organized by the Işbank with speakers Dankwart Rustow, Jerzy Wiatr, and William Hale among others
 May 1981, on Turkish Art and Architecture at the University of Chicago
 October 1981, Atatürk International Research Conference in College of Charleston, with Talat Halman as speaker among others    
 October 1981, Atatürk's Turkey Conference organized by the American Turkish Society and the University of New York City with Bernard Lewis and J. C. Hurewitz  as speakers among others
 October 1981, Atatürk Centennial Symposium organized by the University of Toronto with speakers Talat Halman and Kemal Karpat as speakers
 October 1981, Atatürk and the Modernization of Turkey organized by the Hebrew University in Jerusalem with speakers Jacob Landau, Frank Tachau and William Hale as speakers
 November 1981, International Atatürk Symposium organized by the UNESCO with speakers Dankwart Rustow, Sarvepalli Gopal and S.N. Eisenstadt

References 

Cultural depictions of Mustafa Kemal Atatürk
Anniversaries celebrated in association with UNESCO
Regional centennial anniversaries
International observances